Claduncaria maestrana is a species of moth of the family Tortricidae. It is found in Cuba.

The wingspan is 13–16 mm. The ground colour of the forewings is grey, slightly tinged with ochreous at the costa. The dots, strigulae (fine streaks) and markings are rust brown. The hindwings are brownish cream, but creamish basally.

Etymology
The species name refers to the Maestra Range, the type locality.

References

Archipini
Moths described in 2010
Moths of Cuba
Taxa named by Józef Razowski